Arnold Richardson Lowes (27 February 1919 – 2 July 1994) was an English professional footballer who played in the Football League for Doncaster Rovers and Sheffield Wednesday as a wing half.

Career statistics

References 

English Football League players
Clapton Orient F.C. wartime guest players
English footballers
1994 deaths
Association football wing halves
1919 births
Footballers from Sunderland
Sheffield Wednesday F.C. players
Doncaster Rovers F.C. players
West Ham United F.C. wartime guest players
Watford F.C. wartime guest players
Queens Park Rangers F.C. wartime guest players
Millwall F.C. wartime guest players